In Tibetan cuisine, Sokham Bexe  is a fried dough, with butter and minced meat. It is said to be a favourite of the Dalai Lama and the Panchen Lama.

See also
 List of Tibetan dishes

References

Tibetan cuisine